This is a list of Kosmos satellites.

Due to its size, the list has been split into groups of 250 satellites:

 List of Kosmos satellites (1–250)
 List of Kosmos satellites (251–500)
 List of Kosmos satellites (501–750)
 List of Kosmos satellites (751–1000)
 List of Kosmos satellites (1001–1250)
 List of Kosmos satellites (1251–1500)
 List of Kosmos satellites (1501–1750)
 List of Kosmos satellites (1751–2000)
 List of Kosmos satellites (2001–2250)
 List of Kosmos satellites (2251–2500)
 List of Kosmos satellites (2501–2750)

External links
 NSSDC Master Catalog Spacecraft Query Form
 Gunter's Space Page: Chronology of Space Launches
 Jonathan's Space Report
 TBS satellite
 Astronautix.com

Lists of satellites